This is a list of wind farms in Western Australia.

Table

References

External links

Major WA initiatives
Wind power in Western Australia
 Wind farms in Western Australia: Wind in the Bush

Western Australia
Wind Farms